A More Perfect Union: America Becomes a Nation is a 1989 American feature film dramatizing the events of the 1787 Constitutional Convention.  The film was produced by Brigham Young University to commemorate the 200th anniversary of the drafting of the United States Constitution, and many professors from BYU's School of Fine Arts and Communications were involved in its production either as actors or in other capacities.  After its release, the film was officially recognized by the Commission on the Bicentennial of the United States Constitution as "of exceptional merit".

Plot summary
The film depicts events surrounding creation of the United States Constitution, and is focused mainly on James Madison, who wrote most of that document and took extensive notes during the convention's discussions and proceedings.

The period immediately following the American Revolutionary War was marked by intense political unrest, owing to huge debts, the interruption of trade and business, shortages of labor, and personal turmoils, all created by the War.  It soon became evident that the Articles of Confederation were insufficient to address the country's needs.  A movement soon emerged to upgrade or replace the Articles, and Madison was foremost in the movement.  However, he needed the support of George Washington, and needed to show that a new government would be sufficient to address such challenges as Shays' Rebellion and the growing trade problems between the independent States.

Madison was strongly opposed by those who feared a strong central government, people known either as States Rights Advocates or as Anti-Federalists, such as Roger Sherman and John Dickinson.  Madison was in favor of a bicameral congress, but envisioned both houses being elected according to proportional representation.  In this he was opposed by the States Rights Advocates, and he eventually accepted the compromises necessary to address their concerns.  The film highlights the basis for these compromises.

The film also depicts the convention delegates' debate about the slave trade

Cast
Craig Wasson ...  James Madison
Michael McGuire ...  George Washington
Fredd Wayne ...  Benjamin Franklin
Morgan White ...  George Mason
Douglas Seale ...  Lord Carmarthen
Bruce Newbold ...  Edmund Randolph
James Walsh ...  James Wilson (as James Walch)
Ivan Crosland ...  John Adams
H.E.D. Redford ...  Roger Sherman
Jesse Bennett ...  John Dickinson
Roderick Cook ...  Nathaniel Gorham
Derryl Yeager ...  Alexander Hamilton
James Arrington ...  Gouverneur Morris
Steve Anderson ...  Elbridge Gerry
Dick Cheatham ...  Williams
Richard Dutcher ...  Charles Pinckney
Bruce Eaton ...  Richard Henry Lee
Vince O'Neil ...  John Langdon
Marvin Payne ...  Rufus King
Scott Wilkinson ...  Thomas Jefferson
Lael Woodbury ...  George Wythe
Scott Bronson ...  Robert Morris
Fred Laycock ...  Caleb Strong
Wayne Brennan ...  Oliver Ellsworth
Dave Blackwell ...  Robert Livingston

Production notes
The movie was filmed on location at Independence Hall in Philadelphia, in Williamsburg, Virginia, and at other historical sites.  Much of the film is shot from the viewpoint of James Madison, with the script being based primarily on his writings. These include the copious minutes he took during the Constitutional Convention, which were published as Notes of Debates in the Federal Convention of 1787.

See also
 Founding Fathers of the United States
 List of films about the American Revolution

References

1989 films
1989 drama films
American political drama films
American docudrama films
American Revolutionary War films
Films about presidents of the United States
Films set in the 1770s
Films set in 1787
Constitution of the United States
Cultural depictions of George Washington
Cultural depictions of Thomas Jefferson
Cultural depictions of James Madison
Cultural depictions of Alexander Hamilton
Cultural depictions of John Adams
Cultural depictions of Benjamin Franklin
Films shot in Philadelphia
Films shot in Virginia
Brigham Young University
1980s English-language films
1980s American films